is a tokusatsu superhero TV series.  Created by Shotaro Ishinomori, the series was produced by Toei Company Ltd., and broadcast on Fuji TV from April 5 to September 27, 1973, with a total of 26 episodes. It stars Jirō Chiba.

The hero of this series is a robot named "Robot Detective K" (or just "K"), who has no human form, but when not in battle, dresses up in human clothes and has a human-like personality

Along with Android Kikaider Robot Detective was one of the early predecessors to what would become the Metal Hero Series of programs featuring human-sized cyborg heroes.

Episode List

Cast
: 
Suit Actor: , 
Suit Actor (battle scenes): , 
:  (played as )
: 
: 
: 
: 
: 
: 
: 
: Sonny Chiba (played as )
: , 
:

Songs
Opening Theme:

Ending Theme:

Insert Song:

References

External links

1973 Japanese television series debuts
1973 Japanese television series endings
Shotaro Ishinomori
Toei tokusatsu
Tokusatsu television series
Fictional robots
Fictional police officers
Shunsuke Kikuchi
Fuji TV original programming
Robot superheroes